Theologos is a village in the central part of the Greek island of Thasos. According to the 2011 census, it has 636 residents. It was the marketplace and administrative centre of the island during the Ottoman rule, from 1455 to 1902.

References

Populated places in Thasos